The reality franchise Big Brother debuted in Spain on April 23, 2000 and ended on July 21, 2000, lasting 90 days. This was the third version of Big Brother in global, Netherlands and Germany having aired their editions prior to the Spanish edition. The show was hosted by Mercedes Milá and broadcast on Telecinco.

Ismael was in La Isla de los FamoS.O.S. 1 on 2003.

Israel and Jorge were in Hotel Glam on 2003.

In the 2004 season Gran Hermano VIP 1, Iñigo returned to the house.

In the 2010 season Gran Hermano: El Reencuentro (All-Stars), María José, Silvia and Jorge returned to the house.

Summary 

Start Date: April 23, 2000
End Date: July 21, 2000

Duration: 90 days

The Finalists: 3 - Ismael (The Winner), Ania (Runner-up) and Iván (3rd)

Evicted Housemates: 7 - Koldo (4),Mabel (5), Iñigo (6), Marina (7), Vanessa (8),Israel (9), Maria Jose (10)

Voluntary Exits: 4 - Jorge, Mónica, Nacho and Silvia

Contestants in eviction order

Nominations Table

Notes

See also
 Main Article about the show

2000 Spanish television seasons
GH 1